Otto Babiasch (born 21 March 1937 in Baineț, Romania) is a German former boxer who won the bronze medal at the 1961 European Amateur Boxing Championships in the flyweight category, representing East Germany. He competed for the SC Dynamo Berlin / Sportvereinigung (SV) Dynamo. He also competed in the men's flyweight event at the 1964 Summer Olympics.

1964 Olympic results
Below are the results of Otto Babiasch, a flyweight boxer who competed for the Unified Team of Germany at the 1964 Olympics in Tokyo:

 Round of 32: bye
 Round of 16: defeated Shuta Yoshino (Japan) by decision, 3-2
 Quarterfinal: lost to Robert Carmody (United States) by decision, 1-4

References 

Flyweight boxers
Living people
1937 births
People from Suceava County
German male boxers
Olympic boxers of the United Team of Germany
Boxers at the 1964 Summer Olympics